Johann Joseph Couven (10 November 1701 – 12 September 1763) was a German Baroque architect. He was born in Aachen, where he also died. His legacy includes several religious and secular buildings in Germany (mostly in or near Aachen, e.g. Burtscheid Abbey church), Belgium (a.o. in Eupen and Liège) and the Netherlands (in Vaals, Houthem-Sint Gerlach and Oud-Valkenburg).

1701 births
1763 deaths
German Baroque architects
People from Aachen